Azoxymethane (AOM) is a carcinogenic and neurotoxic chemical compound used in biological research. It is the oxide of azomethane and is particularly effective for the induction of a colon carcinoma.

References

Amine oxides
Carcinogens